The St. Croix Educational Complex, also known as Complex is one of two public high schools located on the island of St. Croix in the United States Virgin Islands. It is operated by the St. Croix School District.

It serves students that live in the western side area of the island.

External links
 
 

High schools in the United States Virgin Islands